Skive Airport is a regional private jet airport in Skive, Denmark.

References

Airports in Denmark
Buildings and structures in the Central Denmark Region
Transport in the Central Denmark Region